Samye Debate, also called Council of Lhasa, Council of Samye, Debate of Samye or Great Debate, was a two-year debate over whether enlightenment happened gradually or suddenly. It took place at Samye Temple, hosted by Trisong Detsen, between Indian Monastics from Nalanda and Chinese Moheyan from Tang Imperial Court between 792 and 794. Kamalaśila was invited to represent Vajrayana while Moheyan represented the East Mountain Teaching of Chan Buddhism.

References

Samye Debate at Encyclopædia Britannica

8th-century Buddhism
Tibetan Empire
790s